Serkan Keskin (born 25 November 1977) is a Turkish actor, director and musician. He is best known for his role as İsmail in hit surreal comedy series Leyla and Mecnun and other awarded movies. He has appeared in more than thirty films since 2004.

Theatre

As actor
 The Birds : Aristophanes – Semaver Kumpanya – 2014
 Scenes from an Execution : Howard Barker – Semaver Kumpanya – 2013
 Metot : Jordi Alceran – Semaver Kumpanya – 2012
 Titus Andronicus : William Shakespeare – Semaver Kumpanya – 2010
 L'Affaire de la rue de Lourcine : Eugène Labiche – Semaver Kumpanya – 2009
 Mother Courage and Her Children : Bertolt Brecht – Semaver Kumpanya – 2008
 Semaver ve Kumpanya : Sait Faik\Yavuz Peman – Semaver Kumpanya – 2007
 Chamaco : Abel Gonzales Melo – Semaver Kumpanya – 2006
 The Tempest : William Shakespeare – Semaver Kumpanya – 2006
 Süleyman ve Öbürsüler : Max Frisch\Yavuz Peman – Semaver Kumpanya – 2005
 Mucizeler Komedisi : Yavuz Turgul – MOS Yapım – 2004
 Murtaza : Orhan Kemal – Semaver Kumpanya – 2003
 Onikinci Gece : William Shakespeare – Semaver Kumpanya – 2002
 Nasrettin Hoca Bir Gün (children play) : Işıl Kasapoğlu – Semaver Kumpanya – 2002
 Pırtlatan Bal (children play) : Aziz Nesin – Semaver Kumpanya – 2002
 Bir Şehnaz Oyun : Turgut Özakman – İzmit Şehir Tiyatrosu – 2001
 The Miser : Molière – İzmit Şehir Tiyatrosu – 2000
 A Midsummer Night's Dream : William Shakespeare – İzmit Şehir Tiyatrosu – 1999
 Hakimiye Milliye Aşevi : Güngör Dilmen – 1998

As director
 Metot : Jordi Alceran – Semaver Kumpanya – 2012
 Resmi Geçit : Loula Anagnostaki – Semaver Kumpanya – 2008
 Deniz Kızı : Aylin Çalap – Semaver Kumpanya – 2003

Filmography

Movies 
Yılbaşı Gecesi : Ozan Açıktan - 2022
Hazine : Canbert Yergüz – 2022
Sen Ben Lenin : Tufan Taştan – 2021
Ben Bir Denizim : Umut Evirgen – 2020
Biz Böyleyiz : Caner Özyurtlu – 2020
Güzelliğin Portresi: Umur Turagay – 2019 // Oktay
Ahlat Ağacı: Nuri Bilge Ceylan – 2019
Butterflies – 2018
Cingöz Recai: Bir Efsanenin Dönüşü : Onur Ünlü – 2017 // Sadri
Tatlım Tatlım: Yılmaz Erdoğan – 2017
Tereddüt: Yeşim Ustaoğlu – 2016
Kırık Kalpler Bankası : Onur Ünlü – 2016
Yok Artık! : Caner Özyurtlu – 2015
Limonata : Ali Atay – 2014 // Selim
Silsile: Ozan Açıktan – 2014 // Cihan
 İtirazım Var : Onur Ünlü – 2014 // Selman Bulut
 Sen Aydınlatırsın Geceyi : Onur Ünlü – 2013 // Yasemin's boss
 F Tipi Film : Grup Yorum - 2012
 Yabancı : Filiz Alpgezmen – 2012
 Yeraltı : Zeki Demirkubuz – 2012 // Tarık
 Eylül : Cemil Ağacıkoğlu – 2011 // Namık
 Av Mevsimi : Yavuz Turgul – 2010 // Forensic doctor
 Unutma Beni İstanbul : Stefan Arsenijevic – 2010
 Takiye: Allah'ın Yolunda "Allah'ın Yolunda" : Ben Verbong – 2010 // Kenan
 Kosmos : Reha Erdem – 2009 // Coffee shop owner
 Pus : Tayfun Pirselimoğlu – 2009 
 Vavien : Taylan Biraderler – 2009 // Süleyman's bounver
 11'e 10 Kala : Pelin Esmer – 2009 // Librarian
 Başka Semtin Çocukları : Aydın Bulut – 2008 // Engin
 Güneşin Oğlu : Onur Ünlü – 2008 // Serkan
 Sonbahar : Özcan Alper – 2007 // Mikail
 Çinliler Geliyor : Serkan Keskin – 2006 // Asım
 Şaşkın : Şahin Alparslan – 2005 // Recai
 Kalbin Zamanı : Ali Özgentürk – 2004 // Tonguç
 Gönül Yarası : Yavuz Turgul – 2004 // Taxi driver
 Korkuyorum Anne : Reha Erdem – 2004
 Tramvay : Olgun Arun – 2004

Series 
 Baba : voice-over – 2022
 Metot : Serkan Keskin – 2021 // Ferhat
 Mucize Doktor : Yağız Alp Akaydın – 2021 // Muhsin Korunmaz
 Ya İstiklal Ya Ölüm : Yasin Uslu – 2020 //
 Öğretmen : Koray Kerimoğlu – 2020 // Yılmaz
 Jet Sosyete – 2019 // Serdar (episode 46)
 Bir Aile Hikayesi : Merve Girgin Aydemir – 2019 // Ufuk Damar
 Masum : Seren Yüce – 2017 // Taner
 Beş Kardeş : Onur Ünlü – 2015 // Sait Başeğmez
 Ben de Özledim : Onur Ünlü – 2013–2014 // Serkan Keskin
 Şubat : Volkan Kocatürk – 2013 // Gerçek Samim Akça 
 Leyla ile Mecnun : Onur Ünlü – 2011–2013 – // İsmail
 Behzat Ç "Bir Ankara Polisiyesi" : Serdar Akar – 2011 // İsmail
 Gönülçelen : Cevdet Mercan – 2010
 Deli Saraylı : Aydın Bulut – 2010 // Mazhar Kazancı
 Ey Aşk Nerdesin : 2009 // Ferhat
 Bu Kalp Seni Unutur mu? : Aydın Bulut – 2009 // İdris
 Mert İle Gert : Hakan Algül – 2008 // Bahri 
 Avrupa Yakası : Jale Atabey −2008 // Yavrum Mithat (guest appearance)
 Derdest : Onur Tan – 2008 // Okan Taşkın
 Bıçak Sırtı : Selim Demirdelen – 2007
 Hırsız Polis : Türkan Derya – 2005 // Bünyamin
 Sevinçli Haller : 2004 
 Çaylak : Nihat Durak – 2003

Songs

Awards
2015 – 20th Sadri Alışık Cinema Awards, "Most Successful Drama Actor" (İtirazım Var)
 51st Golden Orange Film Festival, Best Actor, İtirazım Var, 2014
 21st Golden Cocoon Film Festival, Best Supporting Actor, Silsile, 2014
 32nd İsmail Dümbüllü Awards – 2012

References

External links 

1977 births
Living people
Turkish male film actors
Male actors from Izmit